Nógrádkövesd is a village in Nógrád County, Hungary with 683 inhabitants (2014).

Populated places in Nógrád County